On the event of her wedding to Edward, Duke of Windsor on 3 June 1937 at the Château de Candé, Wallis, Duchess of Windsor (then known as Wallis Warfield) wore a nipped-at-the-waist dress created by Mainbocher in what was termed her signature colour of "Wallis blue" reportedly to match her eyes. Her co-ordinating blue straw hat, by Caroline Reboux, had a halo effect with pale blue tulle and her matching gloves were created from the same blue silk crepe as her dress.

In 1950, Wallis presented the dress to the Metropolitan Museum. More than 25 years after the wedding, it was still regarded as "one of the most photographed, most copied dresses of modern times".

See also
Lobster dress, part of Wallis's wedding trousseau
 List of individual dresses

References

External links
 The Metropolitan Museum of Art - Special Exhibitions; Duchess of Windsor Wedding Dress

Warfield Wallis
British royal attire
1930s fashion
Abdication of Edward VIII
Clothing of the Metropolitan Museum of Art
Wallis Simpson